Xanthophyllum parvifolium is a tree in the family Polygalaceae. The specific epithet  is from the Latin meaning "small leaves".

Description
The smooth bark is greyish or yellowish. The flowers are pale orange, drying orange brown.

Distribution and habitat
Xanthophyllum parvifolium is endemic to Borneo.

References

parvifolium
Endemic flora of Borneo
Trees of Borneo
Plants described in 1973